is a Japanese musician, singer-songwriter and record producer who is the leader of the hard rock/heavy metal bands Bow Wow (known as Vow Wow for a period of time) and Wild Flag. He is known for his skillful guitar playing, with former bandmate Neil Murray calling him one of the top Japanese guitarists, and was one of the first hard rock guitarist to use the tapping technique. Yamamoto often uses 24-fret Yamaha HR guitars.

Career
Through his sister, Yamamoto was influenced by classical music and The Beatles; the first rock song he heard was The Beatles' version of "Rock and Roll Music". He experienced culture shock after seeing the Woodstock film; "Up to that point, I hadn't had a chance to listen to real rock music, so when I saw people smoking dope and running around naked, and musicians like Alvin Lee and Keith Moon in 'Woodstock,' it was like a spark going off in my head." The first song he learned on guitar was "Love Like a Man" by Lee's band Ten Years After, but he was also influenced by Jeff Beck, Ritchie Blackmore and Jimi Hendrix. He started a band at school and music gradually took over his life before he moved to Tokyo.

After entering Yamaha Music School, Yamamoto formed Bow Wow in 1975 and they released their debut album a year later. Yamamoto recalled that when he joined, he told the producer he was a guitarist and not a singer, but during recording someone suggested he sing in English and he went with it. The following year they opened for Aerosmith and Kiss. Yamamoto has called Bow Wow's performance at the 1982 Reading Festival, which was their first show in the United Kingdom, "the most exciting day of my life." In 1984, with the addition of two new members, the group renamed themselves Vow Wow and moved to England in 1986 before disbanding in 1990. Yamamoto reformed Bow Wow with all new members in 1995, however original guitarist and vocalist Mitsuhiro Saito and drummer Toshihiro Niimi rejoined him in 1998 to become a trio. Niimi left Bow Wow in 2015 and Yamamoto and Saito now perform sporadically under the name Bow Wow G2, which refers to the two guitarists being the only official members.

Yamamoto began a solo career in 1980, and has appeared as a special guest performer for numerous musicians. In 1986 he was asked by producer Wilfried F. Rimensberger to participate in the supergroup Phenomena, playing on their second album. Since 1998, Yamamoto has created his solo material entirely by himself, playing every instrument and producing, engineering and mastering the recordings.

Yamamoto was to perform his first solo show in the United States on September 24, 2011, with Karl Wilcox from Diamond Head supporting him on drums. However, the show was cancelled. In December 2017, Yamamoto released the album Voice of the Wind, which took 10 years to make from its original conception.

Yamamoto has been married for over 26 years and has a son, Maoki, who is also a musician.

Discography

Studio albums 
 Horizon (1980)
 Electric Cinema (1982)
 Mind Arc (1998)
 Requiem (1999)
 Time (2005)
 "Time"〜悠久の時を越えて〜 (2006)
 The Life Album (2010)
 Philosophy (2014)
 Lafcadio (2015)
 Voice of the Wind (2017)
 2020 (2020)
 Hope is Marching On (2021)

Compilation albums 
 Guitar Man (1982)
 Healing Collection 〜The Best of Kyoji Yamamoto〜 (2008, CD & DVD)
 Voyager: The Essential Kyoji Yamamoto (2010, US release)

Video albums 
 "Time"〜悠久の時を越えて〜 (2006)
 山本恭司ソロ・コンサート 〜July 21, 2007〜」 (2008)
 Free Style Jam (2015)
 Yokohama Summer Rock Fes. Revolution Rocks 2014 (2015)

 Other work 
 Silver Stars – Ginsei Dan (1979)
 Heavy Metal Army – Heavy Metal Army (1981)
 Yuki Nakajima – The Prophecies (1982)
 Munetaka Higuchi – Destruction ~破壊凱旋録~ (1983)
 Lumina Hayase – 甘い暴力〜 Violence Cat (1983)
 Takanori Jinnai – All Through the Night (1984)
 Mari Hamada – Misty Lady (1984)
 Ella (Malaysian singer) - Ella USA (1994)
 Atsushi Yokozeki – Jet Destiny (2014)
’Inori’m (2011) (Prayer) Producers: Kyoji Yamamoto, Alec Berfield created to provide relief for children victims of the 2011 Tsunami.

Video games 
R: Rock'n Riders – in-game character, music

References

External links 
 
 
 Wild Land artist page

Japanese rock guitarists
Japanese heavy metal guitarists
Japanese heavy metal singers
Japanese male rock singers
English-language singers from Japan
Living people
1956 births
Musicians from Shimane Prefecture
20th-century Japanese guitarists
20th-century Japanese male singers
20th-century Japanese singers
21st-century Japanese guitarists
21st-century Japanese male singers
21st-century Japanese singers